John Hill (1876 – October 1922) was a Negro leagues third baseman and shortstop for several years before the founding of the first Negro National League.

He played for the Cuban X-Giants at the age of 27, moved to the Philadelphia Giants for a couple years, then moved back to the X-Giants where he remained for a big part of his career.

He died in Philadelphia, Pennsylvania in 1922, at the age of 46.

References

External links

Cuban X-Giants players
Philadelphia Giants players
Brooklyn Royal Giants players
1876 births
1922 deaths
20th-century African-American people